Sir Ali bin Salim al-Busaidi (Arabic: علي بن سالم) was a prominent Arab figure in the Kenyan colonial history. He is also a member of the Al Busaid  family that ruled East Africa in the 19th century. His father was the governor of Malindi and then transferred to Mombasa in the late 19th century. Sir Ali al-Busaidi defended the rights of the Arabs in the British colony of Kenya. He established the Seif Bin Salem Library  in Mombasa. He played a leading role in establishing the first Arab school in 1912. He also founded another school His name was named in (Malindi).

Achievements 
In recognition of his efforts, he was awarded a number of decorations, including the Order of Saint Michael and Order of Saint George for his distinguished civil service during the First World War in 1918 and the Order of the British Empire in 1929, "Knight", or "Sir".

References 

Al Said dynasty
History of Kenya
19th-century Arabs
Malindi
Mombasa
19th-century Omani people